The Mount Hood Highway No. 26 (see Oregon highways and routes) is the Oregon Department of Transportation's designation for a  highway from Portland east around the south side of Mount Hood and north via Bennett Pass to Hood River. It is marked as U.S. Route 26 from Portland to near Mount Hood and Oregon Route 35 the rest of the way to Hood River.

Much of the highway is part of the Mount Hood Scenic Byway, a National Scenic Byway which connects Troutdale with Hood River via the southern flank of Mount Hood. The Byway's route includes parts of present-day U.S. Route 26 and Oregon Route 35 and the historic Barlow Road through the Mount Hood Corridor. It also forms a loop with the Historic Columbia River Highway, an All-American Road.

The portion from Sandy to Barlow Pass on the south flank of Mount Hood is aligned to the land portion of the historic Oregon Trail. It was developed in the 1840s as the Barlow Road.

Route description 
The highway begins in Portland at the west end of the Ross Island Bridge, with access to the Oswego Highway (Oregon Route 43), Pacific Highway (Interstate 5) and Pacific Highway West (Oregon Route 10). US 26 itself heads west on Arthur Street, which is not a state-maintained Highway, to reach the Stadium Freeway (Interstate 405).

After crossing the Willamette River on the Ross Island Bridge, the Highway is locally known as Powell Boulevard through Portland and Gresham. State maintenance ends at the Portland/Gresham border, beginning again where the Highway turns southeast at Burnside Street east of downtown Gresham. Soon after that turn, Highway 26 uses the completed part of the Mount Hood Freeway (built only to surface expressway standards) to Sandy, where it runs through downtown on a one-way couplet.

The section of Powell Boulevard from Interstate 205 east into downtown Gresham carries only two lanes. (Right turns were even banned to and from the I-205 north ramps at first.) Division Street runs east into Gresham, where it meets Burnside Road, at which a right turn to the southeast leads into the Mount Hood Highway and US 26. Despite this signage pointing US 26 east on Division Street, traffic already on US 26 is pointed straight along Powell Boulevard (the Mount Hood Highway), in agreement with ODOT's route description.

East of Sandy, the highway is a (mostly) four-lane undivided highway approaching the slopes of Mount Hood; as the highway climbs up towards Government Camp it reduces to two and three lanes. It is four lanes again through Government Camp. East of Government Camp is an interchange with Oregon Route 35, where US 26 heads southeast on the Warm Springs Highway towards Madras and the Mount Hood Highway heads north with Route 35.

Route 35 winds over Bennett Pass and around the eastern side of Mount Hood, and descends into the Hood River Valley. The Mount Hood Highway designation ends at the intersection with the Historic Columbia River Highway, which carries U.S. Route 30 to the west. To the north, the road continues as a spur of the Columbia River Highway No. 2 (Interstate 84), bringing US 30 back onto that freeway. Officially Route 35 heads west from there on US 30 through Hood River to end at I-84 west of that town, but all signage ends at the end of the Mount Hood Highway.

The general public uses the name Mount Hood Highway to refer to much the same route, excluding the portions inside Portland and western Gresham (which are referred to by the street name of Powell Boulevard).

Between 1955 and 1978, the  segment of the route through southeast Portland was proposed to be moved from Powell Boulevard to a new similar alignment known as the Mount Hood Freeway. Due to intense local opposition, this proposed freeway was cancelled.

Scenic Byway 
From Troutdale, the Mount Hood Scenic Byway starts at the end of the Historic Columbia River Highway where the Troutdale Bridge crosses the Sandy River. For the first  of the route, it follows a southwestern path along city streets: west on Glenn Otto Park Road into downtown Troutdale, connecting with Halsey Street, south along 238th Street (which veers to become 242nd Street), Burnside Street, Orient Drive, Dodge Park Boulevard, Lusted Road, and Ten Eyck Road.

The Byway continues into Sandy on US 26, heads west briefly on a spur to Jonsrud Viewpoint on Bluff Road, then backtracks to US 26.

It continues along U.S. Route 26  for about thirty miles, then leaves the highway proper in favor of the business loop through Government Camp. The Byway follows a spur just east of Government Camp to Timberline Lodge. At the eastern outskirts of Hood River, OR 35 intersects with U.S. Route 30 and the Historic Columbia River Highway.

Points of interest
From west to east:
 Sandy River: the mouth close to Troutdale is where William Robert Broughton spotted and named Mount Hood
 Portland Women's Forum State Scenic Viewpoint, also known as Chanticleer Point: views of the Columbia Gorge, Historic Columbia River Highway, Crown Point and Rooster Rock State Park
 Jonsrud Viewpoint: view of Sandy River basin and Devil's Backbone, route of the Oregon Trail and Barlow Road
 Wildwood Recreation Site - Cascade Streamwatch, Oregon: underwater stream and fish habitat viewing,  of interpretive trails along the Salmon River, access to the Salmon-Huckleberry Wilderness via the  Salmon River National Recreation Trail
 Lost Creek Campground: Nature Trail & Old Maid Flats
 Philip Foster Farm National Historic Site
 West Barlow Tollgate: operated from 1874 to 1919
 Laurel Hill Chute: This effectively made the Barlow Road one way by its 60% grade, easily the most harrowing portion of the Oregon Trail.
 Mount Hood Cultural Center and Museum: historic photos by Ray Atkeson in downtown Government Camp, Oregon
 Timberline Lodge and Ski Area
 Trillium Lake/Summit Meadow: a Barlow Road tollgate from 1866 through 1870
 White River Canyon: views of lahar and mud flows and evidence of frequent floods
 Barlow Pass/Pioneer Woman's Grave 
 Toll Bridge County Park
 Panorama Point County Park and Viewpoint
 Jesse and Winifred Hutson Museum: a National Historic Site in Parkdale, Oregon
 Mount Hood Railroad
 Historic Downtown Hood River

Major intersections

References

External links

ORoads - Mount Hood Freeway
Description of Mount Hood Scenic Byway, from a Federal Highway Administration website
Description from the Hood River County Chamber Of Commerce website
Mount Hood Scenic Byway gets federal designation, a September 2005 article from Portland Business Journal
Oregon Transportation Commission approves Byway proposal, a March 2005 press release from the official Oregon website
Mount Hood Scenic Byway (with map), from the Oregon Tourism Commission website

Named state highways in Oregon
Transportation in Portland, Oregon
Mount Hood
U.S. Route 26